The lowering of the flags ceremony at the Attari–Wagah border is a daily CAPF(Central Armed Police Force) practice that the security forces of India (Border Security Force) and Pakistan (Pakistan Rangers) have jointly followed since 1959. The drill is characterized by elaborate and rapid dance-like manoeuvres and raising legs as high as possible, which have been described as "colourful". It is both a symbol of the two countries’ rivalry, and a display of brotherhood and cooperation between the two nations.

Similar parades are organised at the Mahavir/Sadqi border near Fazilka, and the Hussainiwala/Ganda Singh Wala border near Firozpur.

Overview

This ceremony takes place at the Attari–Wagah border, which is part of the Grand Trunk Road. Prior to the opening of the Aman Setu in Kashmir in 1999, it was the only road link between these two countries. It is called the Beating Retreat border ceremony on the international level.

The ceremony starts every evening immediately before sunset with a blustering parade by the soldiers from both sides, and ends with the perfectly coordinated lowering of the two nations' flags. One infantryman stands at attention on each side of the gate. As the sun sets, the iron gates at the border are opened and the two flags are lowered simultaneously. The flags are then folded, and the ceremony ends with a retreat that involves a brusque handshake between soldiers from either side, followed by the closing of the gates again. The spectacle of the ceremony attracts many visitors from both sides of the border, as well as international tourists. In October 2010, Major General Yaqub Ali Khan of the Pakistan Rangers decided that the aggressive aspect of the ceremonial theatrics should be toned down.
The soldiers of this ceremony are specially appointed and trained for this auspicious ceremony. They also have a beard and moustache policy for which they are paid additionally.

2014 suicide attack 

On 2 November 2014, approximately 60 people were killed and at least 110 people were injured in a suicide attack on the Pakistan side of Attari–Wagah border. An 18 to 20 year-old attacker detonated a  explosive in his vest  from the crossing point in the evening right after the Attari–Wagah border ceremony ended.

2016 Indian-Pakistan tensions 
After the India–Pakistan military confrontation on 29 September 2016 the border closing ceremony continued, but on the Indian side public attendance was denied on the evenings between 29 September and 8 October 2016. 
As a sign of the increased tensions, the BSF did not exchange sweets and greetings with Pakistani Rangers on Diwali 2016, despite a long tradition of doing so on major religious festivals like Bakr-Eid and Diwali, and also during Independence Days of both countries.

Other places 

Similar border ceremonies by the Pakistan Rangers and Border Security Force just before sunset are also carried out at other India–Pakistan border posts, such as the: 

Ganda Singh Wala, Kasur district (Pakistani side) / Hussainiwala, Firozpur district (Indian side) 
 Sulemanki, Okara district (Pakistani side) / Sadqi, Fazilka district (Indian side).
 
As at the Attari–Wagah border, border soldiers from both sides intimidate each other by throwing high kicks and by staring, and the ceremonies are concluded by a simultaneous flag or beating retreat. These ceremonies occur in smaller settings, and spectators tend to be local Punjabis rather than tourists from other regions in India, Pakistan, and other countries. The method of drill and parade is also quite different compared to the one in Wagah-Attari border.

See also 
 Attari, Amritsar, India
 Wagah, Lahore, Pakistan
 India–Pakistan border
 Benapole–Petrapole border ceremony

References

External links

 Michael Palin at the India-Pakistan border ceremony on the Pakistani side (from Himalaya with Michael Palin). BBCWorldwide video on YouTube.
 Sanjeev Bhaskar at the India-Pakistan border ceremony on the Indian side. BBCWorldwide video on YouTube.

India–Pakistan relations
Ceremonies in India
Ceremonies in Pakistan
India–Pakistan border
Tourist attractions in Amritsar
Tourist attractions in Lahore
Daily events
Articles containing video clips
1959 establishments in East Punjab
1959 establishments in Pakistan
Punjab Rangers

fr:Wagah#Cérémonie de fermeture de la frontière